Garcia-class frigates were United States Navy warships. These frigates were originally ocean escorts bearing the hull classification DE until 1975. The ships were commissioned between 1964 and 1968 and decommissioned between 1988 and 1990.

Description
Frigates fulfill a Protection of Shipping (POS) mission as anti-submarine warfare (ASW) combatants for amphibious expeditionary forces, underway replenishment groups and merchant convoys.

The Garcias were followed by the similar Brooke class, which was given guided missile armament.

The Bronstein ocean escort was a response to the development of high speed nuclear submarines in the late 1950s. They were powered by steam turbines instead of diesel engines and incorporated a first class anti-submarine warfare (ASW) weapon system: the SQS-26BX sonar, MK 112 ASROC rocket launcher, and MK 32 torpedo tubes. Gun (naval artillery) armament  (MK 33 3 inch/50 caliber) was changed in the Garcia class to two MK 30 5 inch/38 caliber guns.

There were two distinct breeds of ships bearing the DE hull classification, the World War II destroyer escorts (some of which were converted to DERs) and the postwar DE/DEG classes, which were known as ocean escorts despite carrying the same type symbol as the World War II destroyer escorts. All DEs, DEGs, and DERs were reclassified as FFs, FFGs, or FFRs on 30 June 1975 by the United States Navy 1975 ship reclassification.

Pará (D 27) remains in reserve as of 2015.

 was a Garcia-class frigate modified for research use, commissioned as AGDE-1 in 1965, redesignated AGFF-1 in 1975, and redesignated FF-1098 in 1979.

Ships

Gallery

See also
List of frigates of the United States Navy
List of frigates by country and by frigate class

Notes

External links

Garcia-class frigates at Destroyer History Foundation
Dictionary of American Naval Fighting Ships from Naval Historical Center - information about person whom ship was named after plus early ship history
Garcia picture
Voge
Sample
Koelsch
Albert David picture
O'Callahan
Frigate from Naval Vessel Register - all these ships have been decommissioned - see link for status
The Garcia class from Destroyers OnLine - pictures, history, crews
Destroyer Escort Sailors Association more information and history about DEs
USS Voge former crewmember's site with pictures (archive link, was dead)

 
 Garcia
 Garcia
Frigate classes